Kasepää is a small borough in Peipsiääre Parish, Tartu County, Estonia. The population was 194 at the 2011.

External links
Peipsiääre Parish

References 

Boroughs and small boroughs in Estonia
Populated places in Tartu County
Kreis Dorpat